In linguistics, incorporation is a phenomenon by which a grammatical category, such as a verb, forms a compound with its direct object (object incorporation) or adverbial modifier, while retaining its original syntactic function. The inclusion of a noun qualifies the verb, narrowing its scope rather than making reference to a specific entity.

Incorporation is central to many polysynthetic languages such as those found in North America, Siberia and northern Australia. However, polysynthesis does not necessarily imply incorporation (Mithun 2009), and the presence of incorporation does not imply that the language is polysynthetic.

Examples of incorporation

English
Although incorporation does not occur regularly, English uses it sometimes: breastfeed, and direct object incorporation, as in babysit. Etymologically, such verbs in English are usually  back-formations: the verbs breastfeed and babysit are formed from the adjective breast-fed and the noun babysitter respectively. Incorporation and plain compounding may be fuzzy categories: consider backstabbing, name-calling, axe murder.

Oneida 
The following example from Oneida (Iroquoian) illustrates noun incorporation.

In this example, the verbal root hninu appears with its usual verbal morphology: a factive marker (FACT), which very roughly translates as past tense, although this is not quite accurate; an agreement marker (1.SG), which tells us that the verb agrees with 1st person singular (the speaker); and an aspect marker, punctual (PUNC), which tells us that this is a completed event. The direct object ne kanaktaʼ follows the verb. The function of the particle ne is to determine the bed: in the example, I bought this specific bed. Note that the word for bed consists of a root nakt plus a prefix and a suffix. The notion of the root is important here, but the properties of the prefix and suffix do not matter for this discussion.

In the following sentence, the bed is unspecified. Unspecified nouns can be incorporated, thus creating a general statement. In this example: I bought a bed (and not a specific bed). In a broader sense, depending on context, it can even mean that I am a bed buyer, as in: I am a trader of beds, buying beds is my profession.

In this example, the root for bed nakt has incorporated into the verbal construction and appears before the verbal root. Two other incidental changes are noticed here. First, the agreement marker in the first example is k and in the second example is ke. These are two phonologically-conditioned allomorphs. In other words, the choice between using k and ke is based on the other sounds in the word (and has nothing to do with noun incorporation). Also, there is an epenthetic vowel a between the nominal and verbal roots. This vowel is inserted to break up an illegal consonant cluster (and also has nothing to do with noun incorporation).

Panare
The next example, from Panare, illustrates the cross-linguistically common phenomenon that the incorporated form of a noun may be significantly different from its unincorporated form.  The first sentence contains the incorporated form u' of "head", and the second its unincorporated form ipu:

Chukchi
Chukchi, a Chukotko-Kamchatkan language spoken in North Eastern Siberia, provides a wealth of examples of noun incorporation. The phrase təpelarkən qoraŋə means "I'm leaving the reindeer" and has two words (the verb in the first person singular, and the noun). The same idea can be expressed with the single word təqorapelarkən, in which the noun root qora- "reindeer" is incorporated into the verb word.

Mohawk
Mohawk, an Iroquoian language, makes heavy use of incorporation, as in: watia'tawi'tsherí:io "it is a good shirt", where the noun root atia'tawi "upper body garment" is present inside the verb.

Cheyenne
Cheyenne, an Algonquian language of the plains, also uses noun incorporation on a regular basis. Consider nátahpe'emaheona, meaning "I have a big house", which contains the noun morpheme maheo "house".

Chinese (Mandarin)
Chinese makes extensive use of verb-object compounds, which are compounds composed of two constituents having the syntactic relation of verb and its direct object. For example, the verb   'sleep (VO)' is composed of the verb   'sleep (V)' and the bound morpheme object   'sleep (N)'. Aspect markers (e.g.   PERFECTIVE), classifier phrases (e.g.   THREE + CL + hours), and other elements may separate the two constituents of these compounds, though different verb-object compounds vary in degree of separability.

Semantics of noun incorporation
In many cases, a phrase with an incorporated noun carries a different meaning with respect to the equivalent phrase where the noun is not incorporated into the verb. The difference seems to hang around the generality and definiteness of the statement. The incorporated phrase is usually generic and indefinite, while the non-incorporated one is more specific.

In Yucatec Maya, for example, the phrase "I chopped a tree", when the word for "tree" is incorporated, changes its meaning to "I chopped wood". In Lahu (a Tibeto-Burman language), the definite phrase "I drink the liquor" becomes the more general "I drink liquor" when "liquor" is incorporated. The Japanese phrase 目を覚ます me o samasu means "to wake up" or literally to wake (one's) eyes. But when the direct object is incorporated into the nominal form of the verb, the resulting noun 目覚まし mezamashi literally means "waking up", as in 目覚まし時計　mezamashidokei meaning "alarm clock."

This tendency is not a rule. There are languages where noun incorporation does not produce a meaning change (though it may cause a change in syntax — as explained below).

Syntax of noun incorporation

What is noun incorporation? 
An influential definition of noun incorporation (NI) by Sapir (1911) and Mithun (1984) has stated that NI is “a construction in which a noun and a verb stem combine to yield a complex verb.” Due to the wide variation in how noun incorporation presents itself in different languages, however, it is difficult to create an agreed upon and all-encompassing definition. As a result, most syntacticians have focused on generating definitions that apply to the languages they have studied, regardless of whether or not they are cross-linguistically attested.

Noun incorporation can interact with the transitivity of the verb it applies to in two different ways. In some languages, the incorporated noun deletes one of the arguments of the verb, and this is shown explicitly: if the verb is transitive, the derived verb word with an incorporated noun (which functions as the direct object) becomes formally intransitive and is marked as such. In other languages this change does not take place, or at least it is not shown by explicit morphology. A recent study found out that across languages, morphosyntactically highly transitive verbs and patientive intransitive verbs are most likely to perform noun incorporation.

Incorporation looks at whether verb arguments, its nominal complements, exist on the same syntactic level or not. Incorporation is characterized as a stem combination meaning it combines independent lexical items into a modal or auxiliary verb to ultimately form a complex verb. The stem of the verb will be the determiner of the new category in which the incorporation belongs to and the noun which was incorporated drops its own categorical features and grammatical markings, if employed. This is done by the movement of the incorporated noun to its new position in syntax. When participating in noun incorporation, it allows for the speaker to represent an alternative expression to further explain and shift focus to the information being presented (Mithun 1984).

Although incorporation exists in many languages, incorporation is optional and non-obligatory. Incorporation is restricted to certain noun categories; namely on the degree to which they are animate or alive or suppletive forms.

If a language participates in productive compounding it does not allow for incorporation. An example of a compounding language is German. Respectively, if a language participates in incorporation it does not allow for productive compounding.

The most common type of NI is where the incorporated noun acts as the notional subject of the clause. This can be observed in Onondaga, Southern Tiwa and Koryak.

Types of noun incorporation 
In 1985, Mithun introduced a four type system to define the functionality and progression of noun incorporation in a language. This system is important as many discuss this, and it is widely applied to explain the differences in NI in languages. The four types are:

 Lexical compounding: involves a verb incorporating a nominal argument. The resulting compound usually describes a noteworthy or recurring activity. The noun in these compounds are not commonly marked for definiteness or number. 
 Manipulation of case roles: The second type uses the same process to manipulate case roles, incorporating the argument into the verb to allow for a new argument to take its place.
 Manipulation of discourse structure: The third type uses noun incorporation to background old or established information. A speaker might explicitly mention an entity once, for example, and thereafter refer to it using an incorporated verbal compound. This kind of noun incorporation is usually seen in polysynthetic languages.  
 Classificatory Incorporation: The fourth and final type proposed by Mithun involves the development of a set of classificatory compounds, in which verbs are paired with generic nouns to describe properties of an entity, rather than the entity itself.

According to Mithun, languages exhibiting any of these types always display all of the lower types as well. This seems to imply a pattern of progression, as Mithun describes in her 1984 paper on the evolution of noun incorporation. It is argued that it is necessary to distinguish at least two types of noun incorporation.

Accounts for noun incorporation 

A large field of inquiry is whether NI is a syntactic process (verb and noun originate in different nodes and come together through syntactic means, a lexical process (word formation rules that apply in the lexicon dictate NI), or a combined process which investigates the which aspects of noun incorporation can be productively created through general syntactic rules and which must be specified in the lexicon. Of course, this will vary by language as some languages (primarily polysynthetic ones) allow for incorporated structures in a wide variety of sentences whereas in languages such as English, this incorporation is more limited. Theories of morphology-syntax interaction and the debate between syntactic and lexical accounts of NI should strive to be restrictive enough to account for the stable properties of NI in a unified way, but also account for language-specific variations. Within this section, we will focus on describing the influential syntactic and combined approaches to NI, though it is important to note that highly influential lexical accounts, such as Rosen's (1989) paper do exist.

One highly influential syntactic account for NI is the head movement process proposed by Baker (1988). This account states that this NI head movement is distinct from but similar to the better-established phenomenon of phrase movement and involves the movement of a head noun out of object position and into a position where it adjoins to a governing verb. An example of this movement can be seen in figure 1 where the head noun 'baby' is moved out of the object N position to become incorporated with the verb as the sister to the verb 'sit'. While this theory does not account for every language, it does provide a starting point for subsequent syntactic analyses of NI, both with and without head movement. A more recent paper by Baker (2007) addresses a number of other influential accounts including Massam’s pseudo-incorporation, Van Geenhoven’s base generation, and Koopman and Szabolcsi’s small phrase movement. It was concluded that while each have their strong points, they all fail to answer some important questions, thus requiring the continued use of Baker's head movement account.

Others, including Barrrie and Mattieu (2016) have argued against Baker’s  head movement hypothesis. They have investigated Onondaga and Ojibwe and proposed that phrasal movement rather than head movement can account for NI in a number of languages (including Mohawk).

Examples from different languages

Polysynthetic languages 
A polysynthetic language is a language in which multiple morphemes, including affixes are often present within a single word. Each word can therefore express the meaning of full clauses or phrase and this structure has implications on how noun incorporation is exhibited in the languages in which it's observed.

Lakhota 
In Lakhota, a Siouan language of the plains, for example, the phrase "the man is chopping wood" can be expressed either as a transitive wičháša kiŋ čháŋ kiŋ kaksáhe ("man the wood the chopping") or as an intransitive wičháša kiŋ čhaŋkáksahe ("man the wood-chopping") in which the independent nominal čháŋ, "wood," becomes a root incorporated into the verb: "wood-chopping."

Mohawk 
Mohawk is an Iroquoian language in which noun incorporation occurs. NI is a very salient property of Northern Iroquoian languages including Mohawk and is seen unusually often in comparison to other languages. Noun incorporation in Mohawk involves the compounding of a noun stem with a verb stem to form a new verb stem.

Only the noun stem is incorporated into the verb in NI, not the whole noun word.

Mohawk grammar allows for whole propositions to be expressed by one word, which is classified as a verb. Other core elements, namely nouns (subjects, objects, etc.) can be incorporated into the verb. Well-formed verb phrases contain at the bare minimum a verb root and a pronominal prefix. The rest of the elements (and therefore noun incorporation) are optional.
In the example sentences below, one can see the original sentence in 1a and the same sentence with noun incorporation into the verb in 1b where instead of "bought a bed," the literal translation of the sentence is "bed-bought."

It is true in Mohawk, as it is in many languages, that the direct object of a transitive verb can incorporate, but the subject of a transitive verb cannot. This can be seen in the examples below as the well-formed sentence in 2a involves the incorporation of na'tar (bread), the direct object of the transitive verb kwetar (cut). Example 2b represents a sentence that is ill-formed as it cannot possess the same meaning as 2a ('this knife cuts bread'). This is because the subject of the transitive verb, a'shar (knife), is being incorporated into the verb which is not attested in Mohawk.

Further, a unique feature of Mohawk is that fact that this language allows for noun incorporation into intransitives as illustrated in example sentence 3. Hri (shatter) is an intransitive verb which the noun stem ks (dish) is being incorporated into, producing a well-formed sentence.

Another feature of Mohawk which is not as commonly attested cross-linguistically is that Mohawk allows a demonstrative, numeral, or adjective outside the complex verb to be interpreted as a modifier of the incorporated noun. Example sentence 4 illustrates this below. Here, the demonstrative thinkv (that) refers to and therefore modifies the incorporated noun ather (basket).

According to Mithun's (1984) theory of noun incorporation classification, Mohawk is generally considered a type IV language because the incorporated noun modifies the internal argument. As a result of this classification, NI is Mohawk can follow any of the four structures listed in Mithun's paper including lexical compounding, manipulation of case roles, manipulation of discourse structure, and classificatory incorporation.

Baker, Aranovich, & Golluscio claim that the structure of NI in Mohawk is the result of noun movement in the syntax. This is an extension of Baker's head movement hypothesis which is described above. The differences that Mohawk displays as compared to other languages therefore depends on whether or not the person, number, and gender features are retained in the ‘trace’ of the noun, the trace being the position from where the noun moved from object position before adjoinig to the governing verb. Figure 2 illustrates a simplified syntax tree of noun incorporation in Mohawk following Baker's head movement hypothesis. Here, the noun -wir- (baby) is moved from the object N position to become incorporated with the verb as the sister to the verb -núhwe'- (to like). Please note that some details were not included in this tree for illustrative purposes.

 Oneida 
In the Oneida language (an Iroquoian language spoken in Southern Ontario and Wisconsin), one finds classifier noun incorporation''', in which a generic noun acting as a direct object can be incorporated into a verb, but a more specific direct object is left in place.  In a rough translation, one would say for example "I animal-bought this pig", where "animal" is the generic incorporated noun.  Note that this "classifier" is not an actual classifier (i.e. a class agreement morpheme) but a common noun.

 Cherokee 
Cherokee language is a language spoken by the Cherokee people, and is an Iroquoian language. Noun incorporation in Cherokee is very limited and the cases are lexicalized. All of the noun incorporation in Cherokee involves a body part word and few nouns, and to make up for the lack of NI, Cherokee has a system of classificatory verbs with five distinct categories.

 Non-polysynthetic languages 

 English 
English noun incorporation differs from the polysynthetic languages' described above.

Noun incorporation was not traditionally common in English but has over time become more productive.

Productive incorporation involves a singular noun with no determiner, quantifier or adjunct.

Noun incorporation forms a new verb through lexical compounding. The noun brings a recognizable concept that alters the semantics of a verb. This is known as an incorporation complex, decreasing or increasing the verb valency.

In English, it is more common for an argument or an actant to be incorporated with the predicate, which results in additional connotation or metaphoric meaning, e.g., to house-hunt. Although often making the semantics more complex, it simplifies the syntax of the sentence by incorporating the actant-sender house.

English uses only lexical compounding, not composition by juxtaposition nor morphological compounding. Lexical compounding occurs for an entity, quality or activity that deserves its own name, e.g., mountain-climbing. If mountain-climbing were not an institutional activity, the language would be less likely to recognize. To be incorporated into a host verb, the noun's syntactic features get dropped.

English also uses conversion, forming denominal verbs. The incorporated actants do not possess a separate syntactic position in the verbs.

The following illustrates the three sources of incorporation in English with corresponding examples:

In the examples above, the incorporated actant possesses a separate syntactic position in the verb.

 Hungarian 
Hungarian is an Uralic language in which many different types of noun incorporation occur. Hungarian's linguistic typology is agglutinative, meaning that the languages have words that consists of more than one morphemes. Hungarian combines "bare noun + verb" to form a new complex verb, and this would correspond to Mithun's first type of NI, lexical compounding. Phonologically, the V and N are separate words, but in syntactically, the N loses its syntactic status as the argument of the sentence, and VN unit becomes an intransitive predicate. This is demonstrated in the examples below:

To be clear, to 'house-build' is not the same as to 'build a house.' 'house-building' is a complex activity and a unitary concept, and this is applied to other examples as well. The object argument of the underlying verb may be satisfied by the bare noun, but the bare noun does not act as an argument of a sentence like it usually would. In Hungarian, for examples such as one mentioned, the incorporating verb must be imperfective and the complex verb formed from it always must be intransitive.

In Hungarian, incorporated nominals may be morphologically singular or plural - this is dependent on whether languages allow this or not in their incorporation.

One restriction that Hungarian forbids is that bare object nouns cannot be incorporated with prefixed verbs.

Another restriction that Hungarian does not allow is stative verbs cannot allow noun incorporation, even if the stative verbs are not prefixed verbs.

However, it is important note that there are some unprefixed verbs that are perfective and allows NI in Hungarian.

 Korean 
Korean, national language of South Korea and North Korea, is part of Koreanic language family and also has noun incoporation.

Specifically, Korean obeys the Head Movement Constraint by Baker (1988) that was discussed in the prior section.

Korean has incorporated nouns in the structure of [N + VStem + AN1(i)] which is different that the normal N + V like in English. AN is an affix in this case.

In Korean, the noun, the head of the preceding NP, moves to the head of the VP to form a syntactic compound. Then the complex VP moves up to the right of the nominal head position where is '-i' is base-generated.

References

 Further reading 
Baker, Mark C. (1996).  The Polysynthesis Parameter. New York [etc.]: Oxford University Press.
Baker, Mark C. (1988) Incorporation: a theory of grammatical function changing. Chicago:. University of Chicago Press.
Evans, Nicholas & Hans-Jürgen Sasse (eds.). (2002). Problems of Polysynthesis. Berlin : Akademie Verlag.
Kroeber, Alfred L. (1909). Noun incorporation in American languages. In F. Heger (Ed.), XVI Internationaler Amerikanisten-Kongress (pp. 569–576). Vienna: Hartleben.
Kroeber, Alfred L. (1911). Incorporation as a linguistic process. American Anthropologist, 13 (4), 577–584.

Massam, Diane. (2001). Pseudo noun incorporation in Niuean. Natural Language and Linguistic Theory, 19 (1), 153–197.
Mithun, Marianne. (1984). The evolution of noun incorporation. Language, 60 (4), 847-895.

Mithun, M. (1985). Diachronic morphologization: The circumstances surrounding the birth, growth, and decline of noun incorporation. Papers from the Sixth International Conference on Historical Linguistics. Current Issues in Linguistic Theory 6. Jacek Fisiak, ed. Amsterdam-Poznan: John Benjamins-Adam Mickiewicz University, 365–394.
Mithun, Marianne. (1986). On the nature of noun incorporation. Language, 62 (1), 32–38. 
Mithun, Marianne. (2009) Polysynthesis in the arctic. In: Mahieu, M.-A., Tersis, N. (Eds.), Variations on Polysynthesis, The Eskaleut Languages. Benjamins, Amsterdam, pp. 3–18. 
Mattissen, Johanna. (2006) The ontology and diachrony of polysynthesis. In: Wunderlich, D. (Ed.), Advances in the Theory of the Lexicon. Mouton de Gruyter, Berlin/New York, pp. 287–354.
Payne, Thomas E. Describing Morphosyntax, Cambridge University Press, 1997. 
Rosen, Sara T. (1989). Two types of noun incorporation: A lexical analysis. Language, 65 (2), 294–317.
Sadock, Jerrold M. (1980). Noun incorporation in Greenlandic: A case of syntactic word-formation. Language, 57 (2), 300–319.
Sadock, Jerrold M. (1986). Some notes on noun incorporation. Language, 62 (1), 19–31.
Sapir, Edward. (1911). The problem of noun incorporation in American languages. American Anthropologist, 13 (2), 250–282.
Van Valin, Robert D. & Randy LaPolla. (1997). Syntax: Structure, meaning and function''. Cambridge: Cambridge University Press.
Conlang: Advanced Polysynthesis (Wikibooks)
Lexicon of Linguistics
Michael Jonathan Mathew Barrie Dynamic Antisymmetry and the Syntax of noun Incorporation
Van Valin & LaPolla:1997

Linguistic typology
Transitivity and valency